The Gateway Region is the primary urbanized area of the northeastern section of New Jersey. It is anchored by Newark, the state's most populous city. While sometimes known as the Newark metropolitan area, it is part of the New York metropolitan area.

The area encompasses Bergen, Essex, Hudson, Passaic, Union and Middlesex counties.  It is the most urban part of the state, with  a population of more than four million, and is home to most of its larger cities, though much housing was originally developed as suburbs of neighbouring New York City. It is home to Ellis Island, the "gateway" through which many immigrants entered the United States, many of whom chose to stay in the region, which continues to be the port of entry and first home to many born abroad, making it one of the most ethnically diverse of the nation. It may also be the most socio-economically diverse, with some of the biggest pockets of poverty and most exclusive of suburbs in the state.

The designation Gateway Region has not caught on in local parlance, as the topography and self-identification of the residents tend not to correspond to the collective name. The terms North Jersey and Central Jersey are used in describing parts of the Gateway. The name may have been taken from the 1960s Newark nickname Gateway City after the newly developed Gateway Center downtown. Amtrak's high-speed rail project throughout the region is called Gateway. It is one of six tourism regions established by the New Jersey State Department of Tourism, the others being the Greater Atlantic City Region, the Southern Shore Region, the Delaware River Region, the Shore Region and the Skylands Region. The Gateway National Recreation Area, though not located inside the Gateway Region, is nearby.

Geography
The Gateway Region is home to New Jersey's six largest municipalities: Newark, Jersey City, Paterson, Elizabeth, Woodbridge Township, and Edison. Major rivers and the bays include the Hudson River/Upper New York Bay, the Hackensack River and the Passaic River/Newark Bay, and the Raritan. The topography of the area is quite varied, with the Palisades and the Meadowlands in the northeast, the hills and valleys of the Watchung Mountains in the west, the Ramapo Mountains in the north, and tidal plains of the Raritan to the south. The confluence of the roads and railways of the Northeast Megalopolis make the region very heavily traveled. Chemical Coast is a nickname for the heavily industrial area along the Arthur Kill. Though there are broad distinctions between cities, suburbs, heavy industry, light manufacturing, recreational "green spaces", nature preserves, and retail,  transportation, and maritime infrastructure, the landscape is characterized by their close proximity to each other, as is typical of urban sprawl.

History

Lenape and New Netherland
The Gateway Region was the territory of the Lenape Native Americans. Later called Delaware Indian, this collection of Algonquian-language speaking people included the Hackensack, Raritan, and Tappan They are recalled in the countless number of place names given by them to towns, hills, and bodies of water. Much of the land was "purchased" by Dutch and English from the Lenape, though this concept of "ownership" was foreign to them. The Lenape retreated to the west as settlements grew, and "agreed" to re-locate in 1766 with the Treaty of Easton, though some became part of the Ramapough Mountain Indians.

Henry Hudson, an Englishman sailing for the Dutch East India Company anchored his ship the Halve Maen (Half Moon) at Sandy Hook and Weehawken Cove in 1609. The area became part of the colonial province of New Netherland with headquarters in New Amsterdam. In 1630 the patroonship Pavonia was established and 1660, after series of confrontations with the Lenape, that the first chartered village was established on the west bank of the North River at Bergen Square, creating the oldest municipality in the state.  Descendants of the New Netherlanders spread across North Jersey, and influenced its development and character for generations.

Colonial America

When the English entered New York Harbor in 1664, a negotiated surrender (which guaranteed religious tolerance and protection of private property) was made to transfer control of the area to the British crown.
Elizabethtown was founded as the capitol and became the first officially English-speaking settlement, named after the wife of the province's proprietor, Sir George Cateret. In 1666, Newark was established by Puritans from Connecticut. By 1675, the region become the proprietary colony of East Jersey (establishing a border with New York State, which was formalized in 1738). It was partitioned into four counties for administrative purposes: Bergen County, Essex County, Middlesex County and Monmouth County. Settlement remained sparse, though some towns were created within farming communities and along rivers and bays. Among them are Perth Amboy in 1684, Hackensack and Piscataway
in 1693, and New Brunswick in 1736 (which later became home to Rutgers University). During the 18th century, migration inland increased along the Horseneck Tract and Raritan Valley. Slavery and indenture were encouraged to populate the area. The third public reading of The Declaration of Independence took place in New Brunswick, but many East Jerseyans became Tories. Several battles of American Revolution took place in the region including those at Connecticut Farms, Bound Brook, and Paulus Hook.

Invention, industry and immigration

The first steam engine in America was introduced at the Schuyler Copper Mine on New Barbadoes Neck in 1755.
In 1791, Alexander Hamilton help found the Society for the Establishment of Useful Manufactures (S.U.M.), which encouraged the harnessing of the water power of the Great Falls of the Passaic and to secure economic independence from British manufacturers. Paterson, which was founded by the society, became the cradle of the industrial revolution in America, supported in part by the Morris Canal built in the 1820s. A century later Thomas Edison, the Wizard of Menlo Park, made his mark. In 1872 the Singer Manufacturing Company of New York opened a factory in Elizabethport along Trumbull Street next to the intersection of
the CNJ mainline with the Perth Amboy and Elizabethport Branch.
Many discoveries and inventions, or application or mass production of them, were made in the Gateway Region including the steam engine, the revolver, the incandescent light bulb, the phonograph, the rocket engine, and the electric railway. It is the site of the first automobile and first submarine in the United States. It can claim to the birthplace of baseball and the American film industry, Television to the home was first broadcast in the Gateway.

The latter half of the 19th century saw an explosion of the population. German immigration to the United States after 1848 gave the parts of the region a distinctly German flavor. Rail lines which still cross-cross the region, led to the development of the shipping industry at the North River (Hudson River), Newark Bay, and Kill van Kull, and the beginnings of suburban developments such as Llewellyn Park. Streetcar suburbs also began to develop elsewhere.

The Bayway Refinery, started in 1907 is the nation's northernmost, is along the corridor with other heavy industry. It was at this time that the Chemical Coast began to be developed. The Paterson Silk Strike took place in 1913. The Hudson Waterfront became home to heavy industry and shipping. Among the industries that would prosper in the first half of the 20th century were Alcoa Aluminum, the Ford Motor Company, Lever Brothers, Valvoline Oil Co. and Archer-Daniels-Midland.

World Wars

While immigration to Ellis Island decreased the population continued to grow, in part due to the Great Migration. Upon entry to World War I the US government took the Hamburg-American Line piers in Hoboken under eminent domain, and which became the major point of embarkation for more than three million soldiers, known as "doughboys". Camp Merritt was established in Cresskill for troop staging. In 1916, an act of sabotage literally and figuratively shook the region when German agents set off bombs at the munitions depot in New York Bay at Black Tom. Another act of sabotage known as the Kingsland Explosion occurred on January 11, 1917. The T. A. Gillespie Company Shell Loading Plant explosion, though not considered sabotage, also caused tremendous damage.

The fore-runner of Port Authority of New York and New Jersey was established on April 30, 1921. Huge transportation projects opened between the wars: The Holland Tunnel in 1927, The George Washington Bridge in 1931, The Bayonne Bridge in 1931, and The Lincoln Tunnel in 1937, allowing vehicular travel between New Jersey and New York City to bypass the waterfront. Hackensack River crossings, notably the Pulaski Skyway, were also built. Newark Airport was the first major airport in the New York Metropolitan Area, opening on October 1, 1928. At Houvenkopf Mountain crosses were burned by the Ku Klux Klan. Radburn was founded in 1929 as "a town for the motor age".
The Kearney Works of Western Electric kept the plant running with "make work" program, similar to WPA projects.

The region played an import role in World War II effort. PT boats were manufactured by Elco in Bayonne. Military Ocean Terminal at Bayonne (MOTBY) was opened in 1942 as a U.S. military base (remained in operation until 1999). General Motors produced planes at Linden Assembly.The Federal Shipbuilding and Drydock Company would produce over thirty ships before its closing in 1949. In 1946, the baseball color line was first crossed at Roosevelt Stadium by Jackie Robinson.

Post-war prosperity and urban decline

The Second Great Migration and the G.I. Bill changed the social geography as well as the physical geography of the Gateway. Planned and built during the 1950s Port Newark-Elizabeth Marine Terminal is the first and largest container port in the eastern United States.  Direct distance dialing (DDD) was introduced on November 10, 1951 in Englewood The northern parts of the New Jersey Turnpike were opened between 1952 and 1956. The metropolitan section (north of the Driscoll Bridge) of the Garden State Parkway was completed in 1957.  Bergen Town Center was the first mall in New Jersey, opened in 1957, soon followed by Westfield Garden State Plaza. and The Mall at Short Hills. Port Newark-Elizabeth Marine Terminal became the nation's first container terminal in 1958, and was for many years its busiest. The Newark Riots and the Plainfield Riots took place in 1967.

Pre-/post Millennium

The New Jersey Meadowlands Commission was established in 1969 to protect the delicate balance of nature, provide for orderly development, and manage solid waste activities in the New Jersey Meadowlands District, and the Meadowlands Sports Complex opened in 1976. Terminals A, B, and C at Newark Airport were completed in 1973.

People's Express later made the airport its major hub, and passenger volumes increased. Liberty State Park opened in 1976. Gentrification of the Hoboken and Downtown Jersey City nineteenth century districts began in the late 1970s, which led to the eventual re-development of the Hudson Waterfront. Secaucus Junction, Midtown Direct, and Hudson–Bergen Light Rail began service and changed commuting patterns. The Highlands Water Protection and Planning Act was passed in 2004 to protect the watershed which supplies much of the region. Cory Booker became mayor of Newark. The Prudential Center opened in downtown Newark in 2007. American Dream Meadowlands, a large shopping/entertainment complex, opened on October 25, 2019..

Transportation
The Gateway Region has an extensive network of national highways, state freeways, and toll roads; commuter and long distance trains; an expanding light rail system; local and interstate bus routes; and is home to one of the New York/New Jersey metropolitan area's three major airports. Much of the rail and surface transit system is operated by New Jersey Transit and the high transit ridership is mostly oriented to commuters traveling to downtown Newark, lower and midtown Manhattan, and increasingly, the Hudson Waterfront. Outside of the most "city-like" areas of Greater Newark, Elizabeth, Hudson County, and Greater Paterson, the automobile remains the most common means of intra-regional travel. The Port of New York and New Jersey is the busiest on the East Coast of the United States.

Rail

 AirTrain: monorail system connecting Newark Liberty International Airport (EWR) with Amtrak and New Jersey Transit trains
 Amtrak: Northeast Corridor stations at Newark Penn Station (NWK), Newark Liberty International Airport (EWR), New Brunswick, and Metropark
 Hudson-Bergen Light Rail (HBLR): serving Bayonne, Jersey City, Hoboken, and North Hudson at the Weehawken waterfront, Bergenline  (Union City/West New York) and Tonnele Ave (North Bergen)
 Newark City Subway/Newark Light Rail: serving downtown Newark, Branch Brook Park, Belleville, and Bloomfield
 New Jersey Transit Hoboken Division: Main Line (to Suffern, and in partnership with MTA/Metro-North, express service to Port Jervis), Bergen County Line, and jointly with MTA/Metro-North, Pascack Valley Line (limited AM inbound and PM outbound service), all via Secaucus Junction; Montclair-Boonton Line and Morris and Essex Lines (with some service via Secaucus Junction as Midtown Direct); North Jersey Coast Line (limited service as Waterfront Connection); Raritan Valley Line (limited service)
 New Jersey Transit Newark Division: Northeast Corridor Line, North Jersey Coast Line, Raritan Valley Line
 PATH: 24-hour rapid transit system serving  Newark Penn Station (NWK), Journal Square (JSQ), Downtown Jersey City, Hoboken Terminal (HOB), midtown Manhattan (33rd) (along 6th Ave to Herald Square/Pennsylvania Station), and World Trade Center (WTC)
 THE Tunnel (see article for details on recent development)

Air
Commercial scheduled passenger service:
 Newark Liberty Airport (EWR), New Jersey's largest airport
 LaGuardia Airport (LGA) in Flushing, Queens
 John F. Kennedy Airport (JFK) on Jamaica Bay in Queens

General aviation:
 Essex County Airport
 Greenwood Lake Airport, Passaic County
 Linden Airport
 Teterboro Airport, Hackensack Meadowlands
 Old Bridge Airport
 Little Ferry Seaplane Base

Hubs

 Bergenline Station
 Paterson Broadway Bus Terminal
 Hackensack Bus Transfer
 Hoboken Terminal-
 Exchange Place (Jersey City)
 Journal Square Transportation Center
 Newark Broad Street Station
 Newark Liberty International Airport
 Newark Penn Station
 Secaucus Junction

Interstate crossings
 Bayonne Bridge to Staten Island
 Goethals Bridge in Elizabeth to Staten Island, Interstate 278, Staten Island Expressway
 Holland Tunnel in Jersey City to Lower Manhattan, Interstate 78, U.S. Route 1/9
 Lincoln Tunnel in Weehawken to Midtown Manhattan, NJ 495, Route 3
 George Washington Bridge in Fort Lee to Upper Manhattan, Palisades Interstate Parkway, U.S. Route 46, Interstate 95, Interstate 80
 Outerbridge Crossing, from Perth Amboy to Staten Island

Major highways
 Garden State Parkway
 Interstate 78/278
 Interstate 80/280
 New Jersey Turnpike/Interstate 95/New Jersey Route 495 (formerly an interstate highway)
 Palisades Parkway
 Pulaski Skyway

Water

 NY Waterway operates ferry service, from Paulus Hook Ferry Terminal, Hoboken Terminal, Weehawken Port Imperial, Edgewater Landing and other ferry slips in Jersey City, Hoboken, Weehawken to Battery Park City Ferry Terminal at World Financial Center and Pier 11 at Wall Street in lower Manhattan, and to West Midtown Ferry Terminal in midtown Manhattan, where free transfer is available to a variety of "loop" buses.
 From Liberty State Park Hornblower Cruises operates ferries the Statue of Liberty National Monument, Ellis Island and Liberty Island and Liberty Water Taxi runs routes to Paulus Hook and World Financial Center.
 Cape Liberty Cruise Port in Bayonne is one of three passenger terminals in the Port of New York and New Jersey.

Seaports
The Port of New York and New Jersey is the nation's third busiest. Port Newark-Elizabeth Marine Terminal, was the first in the nation to containerize, It and Port Jersey in Bayonne and Jersey City include large segments that are part of Foreign Trade Zone 49.

Media
The Gateway is part of the Greater New York media market.

Newspapers
Many communities have weekly local newspapers specific to their towns, while other daily newspapers have a broader readership and are commonly available in retail shops and for delivery. The following newspapers are daily newspapers serving the Gateway Region market.

Published in New Jersey
 Herald News
 Home News Tribune
 The Jersey Journal
 The Record
 The Star-Ledger

Published in New York
 New York Daily News
 El Diario La Prensa
 New York Post
 The New York Times

Television
The region has ethnic market stations as well as commercial stations that mainly address the metropolitan New York City market as a whole. The WNJN network for New Jersey PBS affiliate stations provide New Jersey-specific news coverage.

Television stations located in and broadcasting from Gateway:

Cable and satellite
 CNBC
 TEMPO Networks

VHF stations (analog)
 Channel 9: WWOR-TV (My Network TV) – Secaucus (New York City)
 Channel 13: WNET (PBS) – Newark (New York City)
VHF stations (digital)
 Channel 8: WNJB (PBS) – New Brunswick – "N.J. Public Television"
UHF stations (analog)
 Channel 34: WPXO-LD (low power) (i) – East Orange
 Channel 39: WDVB-CA (The Pentagon Channel) – Edison
 Channel 41: WXTV (Univision) – Paterson (New York City)
 Channel 47: WNJU (Telemundo) – Linden
 Channel 50: WNJN (PBS) – Montclair – "N.J. Public Television"
 Channel 58: WNJB (PBS) – Newark – "N.J. Public Television"
 Channel 68: WFUT-TV (Telefutura) – Newark (New York City)
UHF stations (digital)
 Channel 40: WXTV (Univision) – Paterson (New York City)
 Channel 53: WFUT-TV (Telefutura) – Newark (New York City)
 Channel 61: WNET (PBS) – Newark (New York City)

Radio 
Radio stations in the Gateway Region include: 
 620 WSNR Jersey City
 930 WPAT Paterson (Ethnic programming)
 970 WNYM Hackensack
 1430 WNSW Newark
 1450 WCTC New Brunswick (talk radio)
 1530 WJDM Elizabeth and 97.5 Jersey City (Spanish programming)
 1660 WWRU Jersey City (Korean programming)
 88.3 WBGO Newark (Jazz/Newark Public Radio)
 88.7 WPSC-FM Wayne (William Paterson University, indie hip hop)
 88.7 WRSU New Brunswick (freeform)
 89.1 WFDU Teaneck (Fairleigh Dickenson University, eclectic music)
 90.3 WMSC Montclair (Montclair State College, indie/eclectic)
 90.3 WVPH Piscataway (freeform) 
 91.1 WFMU East Orange (freeform)
 93.1 WPAT-FM Paterson (Spanish contemporary)
 94.7 WXBK Newark (Hip-hop music)
 95.9 WYNE-LP Wayne (Christian programming)
 98.3 WMGQ New Brunswick (adult contemporary)
 99.1 WAWZ Zarepath (Christian contemporary music)
 100.3 WHTZ Newark (pop music)
 105.9 WQXR Newark (public radio)

Cuisine

Language

Annual events
There are re-occurring events throughout the year in the Gateway including street fairs, First Nights, Summer stock theatre, county fairs, fireworks, and other festivals. Among them are:
 All Points West Music & Arts Festival
 The Bamboozle
 Black Maria Film Festival
 Cherry Blossom Festival in Branch Brook Park
 Cuban Parade of New Jersey
 Philippine Fiesta at Meadowlands Exposition Center
 Geraldine R. Dodge Poetry Festival
 German-American Volksfest
 Hambletonian, the first leg of the Trotting Triple Crown, at Meadowlands Racetrack
 Hoboken Film Festival
 Hudson County Film and Video Festival
 Hudson River Waterfront Marathon
 Hungarian Festival
 Jersey City Pride
 Macy's Fireworks Spectacular on Independence Day
 Newark Black Film Festival
 New Jersey Jewish Film Festival, spring
 New Jersey Film Festival
 New Jersey Independent South Asian Cine Fest
 New Jersey State Interscholastic Athletic Association
 New Jersey Folk Festival
 Passion Play at Park Theater
 Portugal Day Festival, also known as Portugal Day Feast or Chop Fest 
 Rutgers Agricultural Field Day
 Santakrusan Procession
 State Fair Meadowlands

Exhibitions and performances

Historic sites and exhibitions
The Gateway Region is home to many points of historical interest, including districts, private homes, places of worship, train stations, civic and industrial architecture, and structures of engineering significance. The Statue of Liberty, Ellis Island, and the Central Railroad of New Jersey Terminal national symbols of mass immigration to the United States are all located on the Upper New York Bay. The Edison National Historic Site and the Great Falls of the Passaic River speak to the innovation of the region.  Administered by the New Jersey Department of Environmental Protection, the New Jersey Register of Historic Places mirrors the National Register of Historic Places, and uses the same criteria for eligibility. Most counties have historical societies and many municipalities assign historic designation or preservation status. The New Jersey Historical Society maintains archives and promotes research. There are also museums with thematic exhibitions.

 Statue of Liberty National Monument, Ellis Island and Liberty Island
 Afro-American Historical and Cultural Society Museum
 American Labor Museum
 Cathedral Basilica of the Sacred Heart
 Aviation Hall of Fame and Museum of New Jersey
 Fort Lee Historic Park
 Hoboken Historical Museum
 Lambert Castle Museum
 Jewish Museum of New Jersey
 Thomas Alva Edison Memorial Tower and Museum
 Maywood Station Museum
 Museum of African American Music (under construction)
 New Bridge Landing
 New Jersey Naval Museum
 Paterson Museum at Rogers Locomotive and Machine Works
 Yogi Berra Museum and Learning Center
 Whippany Railway Museum
 National Register of Historic Places listings in Hudson County, New Jersey
 National Register of Historic Places listings in Bergen County, New Jersey
 National Register of Historic Places listings in Essex County, New Jersey
 National Register of Historic Places listings in Passaic County, New Jersey
 National Register of Historic Places listings in Union County, New Jersey
 National Register of Historic Places listings in Middlesex County, New Jersey

Science and natural history
 AIDS Museum
 Liberty Science Center
 Nature Center & Observatory at Rifle Camp Park
 Newark Museum
 New Jersey Museum of Agriculture
 Rutgers UniversityGeology Museum
 William Miller Sperry Observatory

Visual arts
 Albus Cavus
 Bergen Museum of Art and Science
 Clifton Arts Center & Sculpture Park
 Hiram Blauvelt Wildlife Art Museum
 Jane Voorhees Zimmerli Art Museum
 Jersey City Museum
 Jewish Museum of New Jersey
 Montclair Art Museum
 Newark Museum
 Visual Arts Center of New Jersey
 Norton and Nancy Dodge Collection of Soviet Nonconformist Art

Music and stage
Located near New York City, many residents and visitors take advantage of and contribute to performances in music, theater, and dance. There are many theater and dance companies throughout the region. Major companies, events, and performance venues include:

 Bergen Performing Arts Center
 DeBaun Center for Performing Arts
 Stephen J. Capestro Theatre
 George Street Playhouse
 Hudson River Performing Arts Center (proposed)
 Kasser Theater
 Loew's Jersey Theater
 Maxwell's
 New Jersey Ballet
 New Jersey Performing Arts Center
 New Jersey Youth Symphony
 New Jersey Youth Symphony
 Shakespeare Theatre of New Jersey at nearby Drew University
 Newark Symphony Hall
 Paper Mill Playhouse
 Park Performing Arts Center
 Premiere Stages
 Players Guild of Leonia
 Prudential Center, nicknamed the "Rock"
 Meadowlands Stadium and Meadowlands Arena
 State Theater
 Union City Performing Arts Center
 Union County Arts Center
 William Carlos Williams Center for the Performing Arts

Sport teams and venues

The Gateway is home to five teams from major professional sports leagues playing in the state (though three teams identify as being from New York), as well as minor league teams. Since the 1970s several new stadiums and arenas have been built mostly near Downtown Newark or as part of the Meadowlands Sports Complex, which since 2009 can be reached with the Meadowlands Rail Line.

The teams are:
 National Hockey League – New Jersey Devils
 Major League Soccer – New York Red Bulls
 Major League Lacrosse – New Jersey Pride and Bergen River Dogs
 National Football League – New York Giants and New York Jets
 Great Lakes Indoor Football League – New Jersey Revolution
 Minor League Baseball teams – New Jersey Jackals, Newark Bears and Bergen Cliff Hawks
 Major Indoor Soccer League (2001–2008) – New Jersey Ironmen

The venues include:
 Bergen Ballpark at the Meadowlands (proposed) at American Dream Meadowlands
 MetLife Stadium
 Meadowlands Racetrack
 Izod Center, commonly called Meadowlands Arena
 Riverfront Stadium
 Prudential Center, nicknamed the "Rock"
 Red Bull Arena
 South Mountain Arena

Nature and outdoor recreation

Environmental centers

 Flat Rock Brook Nature Center
 Liberty State Park Interpretive Center
 Meadowlands Environment Center
 Nature Center & Observatory at Rifle Camp Park
 Tenafly Nature Center
 Trailside Nature & Science Center
 Cora Hartshorn Arboretum and Bird Sanctuary
 Closter Nature Center
 James A. McFaul Environmental Center (Wyckoff)
 Lorrimer Sanctuary (Franklin Lakes)
 Weis Ecology Center (Ringwood)

Horticulture

 Branch Brook Park Cherry Blossom Festival
 Cora Hartshorn Arboretum and Bird Sanctuary
 Durand-Hedden House and Garden
 New Jersey State Botanical Garden – Skylands, Ringwood State Park
 Presby Memorial Iris Gardens – Montclair
 Reeves-Reed Arboretum – Summit
 Rutgers Gardens – Rutgers University, New Brunswick
 Howard Van Vleck Arboretum – Montclair
 Florence and Robert Zuck Arboretum – Drew University, Madsion
 Greenwood Gardens

National natural landmarks
 Great Falls-Garret Mountain
 Great Swamp
 Palisades of the Hudson
 Pigeon Swamp State Park
 Riker Hill Fossil Site

Parks, reserves, and forests

 Bergen Parks
 Hudson Parks
 Essex Parks
 Middlesex Parks
 Union Parks
 Watchung Mountain Reservations
 Branch Brook Park
 Cheesequake State Park
 Eagle Rock Reservation
 De Korte Park
 Gateway National Recreation Area at Sandy Hook
 Garret Mountain Reservation
 Hackensack RiverWalk
 Middlesex Greenway Trail, part of the planned East Coast Greenway trail
 High Mountain Park Preserve
 Hudson River Waterfront Walkway
 Liberty State Park
 Lincoln Park/West Bergen
 Mills Reservation
 New Jersey Meadowlands Commission
 Palisades Interstate Park
 Ramapo Mountain State Forest
 Ringwood Manor State Park
 South Mountain Reservation
 Wawayanda State Park
 Weequahic Park

Zoos
 Bergen County Zoological Park
 Newark Museum
 Turtle Back Zoo

State prisons 
 Rahway State Prison
 Northern State Prison

Superfund sites
The region has some of the highest concentration of super fund sites in the nation.

 Kin-Buc Landfill
 Middlesex Sampling Plant

Universities and colleges

 Bergen Community College
 Berkeley College
 Bloomfield College
 Caldwell College
 Essex County College
 Fairleigh Dickinson University
 Felician College
 Gibbs College
 Hudson County Community College

 Kean University
 Middlesex County College
 Montclair State University
 New Brunswick Theological Seminary
 New Jersey City University
 New Jersey Institute of Technology
 Passaic County Community College
 Ramapo College
 Raritan Valley Community College

 Rutgers University
 Saint Peter's University
 Seton Hall University
 Stevens Institute of Technology
 Union County College
 University of Medicine and Dentistry of New Jersey
 William Paterson University

See also
 New York metropolitan area
 Port Authority of New York and New Jersey
 Tri-State Region
 North Jersey Shared Assets Area
 North Jersey
 Regions of New Jersey

References

External links
 The Hub of New Jersey: The Gateway Region
 Gateway Region Tourism Council
 New Jersey Festivals

Regions of New Jersey
North Jersey
Bergen County, New Jersey
Essex County, New Jersey
Hudson County, New Jersey
Middlesex County, New Jersey
Passaic County, New Jersey
Union County, New Jersey
New Jersey Urban Enterprise Zones
New York metropolitan area
Tourism regions of New Jersey